Asterostigma is a genus of flowering plants in the family Araceae. It is native to  Brazil  and Argentina. The leaves are pinnate and the plant is tuberous.

Species
Asterostigma cryptostylum Bogner - Brasília, Goiás, Minas Gerais
Asterostigma cubense (A.Rich.) K.Krause ex Bogner - São Paulo
Asterostigma lividum (G.Lodd.) Engl. - southern Brazil; Misiones Province of Argentina
Asterostigma lombardii E.G.Gonç. - Minas Gerais, Espírito Santo
Asterostigma luschnathianum Schott - southern Brazil
Asterostigma reticulatum E.G.Gonç - southern Brazil
Asterostigma riedelianum (Schott) Kuntze - eastern Brazil
Asterostigma tweedieanum Schott - Santa Catarina in southern Brazil

References

Aroideae
Araceae genera
Flora of South America